The 2022 Presidential Tour of Turkey was a road cycling stage race held between 10 and 17 April 2022 in Turkey. It was the 57th edition of the Presidential Tour of Turkey.

Teams 
Six UCI WorldTeams, twelve UCI ProTeams and seven UCI Continental teams participated in the race.

UCI WorldTeams

 
 
 
 
 
 

UCI ProTeams

 
 
 
 
 
 
 
 
 
 
 
 

UCI Continental Teams

Route 
The 2022 edition included eight stages covering  over eight days. Although only seven stages were raced due to the final stage being cancelled.

Stages

Stage 1 
10 April 2022 — Bodrum to Kuşadası,

Stage 2 
11 April 2022 — Selçuk to Alaçatı,

Stage 3 
12 April 2022 — Çeşme to Izmir,

Stage 4 
13 April 2022 — Izmir to Mount Sipylus,

Stage 5 
14 April 2022 — Manisa to Ayvalık,

Stage 6 
15 April 2022 — Edremit, Balıkesir to Eceabat,

Stage 7 
16 April 2022 — Gelibolu to Tekirdağ,

Stage 8 
17 April 2022 — Istanbul to Istanbul, 
Cancelled after 25km

Classification leadership table

Notes
 In Stage 2 Jasper Philipsen who was second in the points classification wore the green points jersey as first placed Caleb Ewan wore the Cyan Leaders jersey.
 In Stage 3 Jasper Philipsen who was second in the points classification wore the green points jersey as first placed Kaden Groves wore the Cyan Leaders jersey. Vitaliy Buts who was wore the Turkish beauties white jersey as first  placed Noah Granigan wore the red mountain jersey.
 In Stage 4 Kaden Groves who was second in the points classification wore the green points jersey as first placed Jasper Philipsen wore the Cyan Leaders jersey.
 In Stage 5 Noah Granigan who was second in the mountain classification wore the red jersey as first placed Eduardo Sepúlveda wore the Cyan Leaders jersey.

Final standings

General classification

Points classification

Mountains classification

Turkish Beauties Sprints classification

Team classification

References

Sources

External links 

2022
Presidential Tour of Turkey
Presidential Tour of Turkey
Presidential Tour of Turkey
Presidential Tour of Turkey